The 2019–20 Little Rock Trojans men's basketball team represented the University of Arkansas at Little Rock in the 2019–20 NCAA Division I men's basketball season. The Trojans, were led by 2nd-year head coach Darrell Walker, play their home games at the Jack Stephens Center in Little Rock, Arkansas as members of the Sun Belt Conference. They finished the season 21–10, 15–5 in Sun Belt play to win the Sun Belt regular season championship. They were the No. 1 seed in the Sun Belt tournament, however, the tournament was cancelled amid the COVID-19 pandemic. Due to the Sun Belt Tournament cancellation, they were awarded the Sun Belt's automatic bid to the NCAA tournament. However, the NCAA Tournament was also cancelled due to the same outbreak.

Previous season
The Trojans finished the 2018–19 season 10–21, 5–13 in Sun Belt play to finish in a tie for last place. They failed to qualify for the Sun Belt tournament.

Roster

Schedule and results

|-
!colspan=12 style=| Exhibition

|-
!colspan=12 style=| Non-conference regular season

|-
!colspan=9 style=| Sun Belt Conference regular season

|-
!colspan=12 style=| Sun Belt tournament
|- style="background:#bbbbbb"
| style="text-align:center"|Mar 14, 202011:30 am, ESPN+
| style="text-align:center"| (1)
| vs. (5) Georgia SouthernSemifinals
| colspan=2 rowspan=1 style="text-align:center"|Cancelled due to the COVID-19 pandemic
| style="text-align:center"|Smoothie King CenterNew Orleans, LA
|-

Source

References

Little Rock Trojans men's basketball seasons
Little Rock Trojans
Little Rock Trojans men's basketball
Little Rock Trojans men's basketball